Il programmino di Gigi D'agostino (English: The Programme of Gigi D'Agostino) is the third compilation album by Italian DJ Gigi D'Agostino, released in 2003 through NoiseMaker / Media Records.

Track listing

Disc one
 Exch Pop True - "Discoteca" – 5:20
 DeVision - "Drifting Sideways" – 3:53
 Naommon - "I'm Not Ashamed" – 5:53
 Soulkeeper - "Deeper" – 3:23
 Jay-Jay Johanson - "On The Radio" – 6:12
 Wolfsheim - "The Sparrows and the Nightingales" – 6:45
 DeVision - "Digital Dream" – 5:47
 Wolfsheim - "It's Not Too Late" – 6:13
 The Twins - "Face To Face Re Recorded Version" – 5:03
 Lio Amoureaux - "Solitaires" – 3:33
 Ken Laszlo - "Inside My Music" – 5:28
 Gigi D'Agostino - "Noi Adesso E Poi" – 7:43
 Gigi D'Agostino - "Bla Bla Bla (Blando Mix)" – 6:13
 Gianfranco Bortolotti & Gigi D'Agostino - "Forrest Gump Suite" – 6:19

Disc two
 Gigi D'Agostino - "Hymn" – 6:58
 Egiziano - "Clocks" – 6:39
 Paul Van Dyk - "For an Angel" – 6:42
 Gigi D'Agostino - "Taurus" – 4:06
 Nebular B - "Liquid" – 6:39
 Gigi D'Agostino - "Caffé" – 4:17
 Brinton McKay - "1K Digit Disco" – 6:18
 Gigi D'Agostino - "Passa" – 3:29
 Gigi D'Agostino - "Troppo" – 5:34
 Gigi D'Agostino - "Egiziano" – 3:46
 Mr X & Mr Y - "New World Order" – 6:08
 Gigi D'Agostino - "Fomento" – 9:39
 Allure - "No More Tears" – 9:10

References

Gigi D'Agostino albums
2003 compilation albums